Ceroxylon echinulatum, also known as the Pumbo wax palm is a species of flowering plant in the family Arecaceae. It is found only in Ecuador and Peru. Its natural habitat is subtropical or tropical moist montane forests in the Andes. It is threatened by habitat loss.

References

echinulatum
Flora of the Andes
Vulnerable plants
Trees of Ecuador
Trees of Peru
Taxonomy articles created by Polbot